Beaverton Central is a light rail station on the MAX Blue Line in Beaverton, Oregon, United States.

The station, located near Beaverton's downtown area, is surrounded by a mixed-use development, The Round at Beaverton Central, the present location of the main offices of The Linux Foundation, previously the Open Source Development Labs. In March 2011, TriMet received a federal grant to pay for the installation of security cameras at the station. Traveling eastbound, this is the final station to be served only by the Blue Line until the East 102nd Avenue station.

References

External links
Station information (with eastbound ID number) from TriMet
Station information (with westbound ID number) from TriMet
MAX Light Rail Stations – more general TriMet page

MAX Light Rail stations
MAX Blue Line
1998 establishments in Oregon
Railway stations in the United States opened in 1998
Transportation in Beaverton, Oregon
Railway stations in Washington County, Oregon